Cinyra is a genus of beetles in the family Buprestidae, containing the following species:

 Cinyra alvarengai (Cobos, 1975)
 Cinyra obenbergeri (Cobos, 1975)
 Cinyra pulchella Weidlich, 1987
 Cinyra seabrai (Cobos, 1975)
 Cinyra splendens (Thery, 1923)
 Cinyra strandi (Obenberger, 1936)

References

Buprestidae genera